"Second Sight" is the fifth episode of the eighth season of British television show Midsomer Murders and the fortieth episode overall. It stars John Nettles as Detective Chief Inspector Tom Barnaby and John Hopkins as Detective Sergeant Dan Scott.

John Ransom collapses and dies outside a pub after a fight with his brother-in-law over the baptism of his niece. He has electrical scars across the top of his head, from being a lab rabbit for his brother "Mad" Max, who was conducting experiments on his sibling, suspecting him of having the ability, known as "Second Sight" to predict events that should be unpredictable.

Cast
 John Nettles ... DCI Tom Barnaby
 John Hopkins ... DS Dan Scott
 Jane Wymark ... Joyce Barnaby
 Laura Howard ... Cully Barnaby
 Barry Jackson ... Dr. George Bullard
 Owen Teale ... Little Mal Kirby / Young Mal
 Will Keen ... Preaching Pete Kubatski
 Geoffrey Whitehead ... Dr. Gregory Ransom
 Joe Anderson ... Max Ransom
 Tom Frederic ... Ben Kirby
 Bill Stewart ... Lucky Lol Tanner
 Wanda Ventham ... Romany Rose
 Sean Chapman ... Jimmy Kirby
 Alexandra Moen ... Emma Kirby
 James Hoare ... John Ransom
 Imogen Holthouse ... Young Emma
 Erin and Lauren Oliver ... Christine Kirby (baby)

Midsomer Murders episodes
2005 British television episodes